Vostok Highway is a Russian federal highway currently under construction that will run  between Khabarovsk and Nakhodka.

References

Roads in Siberia